Cassiano Ricardo (July 26, 1895 – January 14, 1974) was a Brazilian journalist, literary critic, and poet.

An exponent of the nationalistic tendencies of Brazilian modernism, he was associated with the Green-Yellow and Anta groups of the movement before launching the Flag group, a social-democratic reaction to these groups. His work evolved into concrete poetry at the end of his career.

Early life 
Cassiano Ricardo was born in São José dos Campos, São Paulo, in 1895.

Career 

Ricardo, formerly a Symbolist poet, became a late adherent to Brazilian modernism and co-founded the mystical nationalist journal Novíssima. In the following year, 1926, he launched the Green-Yellow movement, with Menotti del Picchia, Cândido Motta Filho and Plínio Salgado. In 1928, he co-founded the Flag group, again with Menotti del Picchia and Cândido Motta Filho.

His 1928 book Marcha para Oeste supported the frontier for being both anti-liberal and democratic. He held a hierarchical view of such a society with the whites holding "the spirit of adventure and command".

In 1937, he was elected to the Brazilian Academy of Letters, where he campaigned for the Modernist poets to be formally recognized and appreciated.

Bibliography
 Dentro da noite (1915)
 A flauta de Pã (1917)
 Jardim das Hespérides (1920)
 A mentirosa de olhos verdes (1924)
 Vamos caçar papagaios (1926)
 Borrões de verde e amarelo (1927)
 Martim Cererê (1928)
 Deixa estar, jacaré (1931)
 Canções da minha ternura (1930)
 Marcha para Oeste (1940)
 O sangue das horas (1943)
 Um dia depois do outro (1947)
 Poemas murais (1950)
 A face perdida (1950)
 O arranha-céu de vidro (1956)
 João Torto e a fábula (1956)
 Poesias completas (1957)
 Montanha russa (1960)
 A difícil manhã (1960)
 Jeremias sem-chorar (1964)
 Os sobreviventes (1971)

References 
Footnotes

Sources

External links
 FCCR - Fundação Cultural Cassiano Ricardo

Brazilian journalists
1895 births
1974 deaths
People from São José dos Campos
Members of the Brazilian Academy of Letters
Brazilian male poets
Brazilian essayists
20th-century Brazilian poets
20th-century essayists
20th-century Brazilian male writers
20th-century journalists